I.Q. is a 1994 American romantic comedy film directed by Fred Schepisi and starring Tim Robbins, Meg Ryan, and Walter Matthau. The original music score was composed by Jerry Goldsmith. The film, set in the mid 1950s, centers on a mechanic and a Princeton doctoral candidate who fall in love, thanks to the candidate's uncle, Albert Einstein.

Plot

Easy-going mechanic Ed Walters, meets Princeton University mathematics doctoral candidate Catherine Boyd, as she and her critical English fiancé, experimental psychology professor James Moreland enters Ed's garage as their car breaks down. There is an immediate "electric" connection which Ed recognizes as he falls in love with her at first sight, which she does not perceive.

Inside the garage, Ed excitedly tells his fellow mechanics that he envisions their future together, their marriage and kids. Catherine comes in, and unconsciously jumbles up her words, but he understands her perfectly. 

Finding a watch Catherine left accidentally, Ed goes to her address, coming face to face with Albert Einstein, Catherine's uncle. Albert and his mischievous friends, scientists Nathan Liebknecht, Kurt Gödel, and Boris Podolsky, accept Ed as a friend after he answers a philosophical question on time and then retrieves their birdie etc from a tree.

Ed tells them when he and Catherine met, everything slowed down and he had a moment of clarity. The scientists see him as someone better suited for her. Ed takes Einstein to the university on his motorcycle to find Catherine. Although unsuccessful in getting a date with her, he makes her laugh. 

At a university dinner, James and Catherine show their differing views. He describes an academic, intellectual experience for their honeymoon. In contrast, she describes a sensual one in Maui. James pulls her aside, berating her, so she accuses him of not loving her. Then Catherine gets home and tells Albert James' plans for them: He'll be a full professor at Stanford, while she is a homemaker and fulltime mother.

The four scientists get Ed's garage to transform their car into a convertible, brainstorming about how Ed can pique Catherine's interest. He jokingly asks to "borrow their brains", inspiring them to give him a makeover. Catherine finds Ed apparently discussing his idea of a nuclear fusion space shuttle engine with them. She talks him into presenting its paper at a symposium at Princeton's Institute for Advanced Study. 

Initially, they get away with it. At a reception afterwards, the scientists get Catherine and Ed together alone under the stars. When James arrives, Albert feigns a swoon. Insisting Catherine and Ed drive him home for his pills, he 'finds them' in his pocket. The three stop at a café to get out of the rain. When Catherine suddenly wants to go when she feels Ed's feelings for her, Albert distracts her. Playing a waltz on the jukebox, he then has Ed cut in. They suddenly leave when she remembers James is expecting her.

James challenges Ed in front of the press to do a very public set of intelligence tests. After solving the puzzles quickly, the scientists aid him with the 50 questions, so he's given a 186 I.Q. They've made it on the cinema's newsreel, pleasing Catherine. However, going over Ed's calculations, she sees something off and approaches her uncle. Albert causes her to doubt herself, as he fears Ed will be found out. When Catherine leaves distraught, Ed insists that she's more intelligent than she believes.

Uncle Albert arranges a small sailing excursion with him, Catherine, Ed and James, but the scientists delay James. Albert sneakily knocks her off balance so she falls into Ed's lap. Catherine finally says she loves him, and they kiss.

Back at the garage, Ed admits he hasn't told Catherine the truth. Simultaneously, she figures it out. President Eisenhower turns up, pleased with the supposed nuclear fusion engine. Catching up with the presidential motorcade, Ed meets Catherine in a field. She chews him out, but as they believe he's proposing, she says to kiss. He tells her she'd also fallen in love with him at first sight but needed the ruse. Catherine openly slaps him and returns to the motorcade.

Realising she's found out, Arnold announces Catherine has finally seen through the "intellectual Ed" ruse. He congratulates her on mathematically disproving his theory of 30 years ago, something he couldn't do as he's terrible at math.

At the symposium, after James has blatently accused Einstein and Walters of fraud, Albert turns the tables on him. He says 'Operation Red Cabbage' was their plan to prove the Russians were lying about advances in space, and Ms. Boyd and Mr. Walters were key in it.

Albert is rushed to the hospital, where he asks Catherine to listen to her heart and not let her head keep her from love. Outside, Ed tells her he hopes she one day realises how extraordinary she is.

In Stargazers' Field Catherine admits she's fallen for Ed.

Cast

 Tim Robbins as Ed Walters
 Meg Ryan as Catherine Boyd
 Walter Matthau as Albert Einstein
 Lou Jacobi as Kurt Gödel
 Gene Saks as Boris Podolsky
 Joseph Maher as Nathan Liebknecht
 Stephen Fry as James Moreland
 Daniel von Bargen as Secret Service Agent
 Tony Shalhoub as Bob Rosetti
 Frank Whaley as Frank
 Charles Durning as Louis Bamberger
 Keene Curtis as Dwight D. Eisenhower
 Alice Playten as Gretchen
 Greg Germann as Bill Riley, Times reporter

Dramatic alterations
For dramatic reasons, I.Q. fictionalizes the lives of certain real people. Albert Einstein did not have a niece by the name of Catherine Boyd. Kurt Gödel was famously shy and reclusive, unlike his fictional counterpart in this film. The movie gives the impression that Einstein and his friends are all around the same age, when in fact, they were between 17 and 30 years younger than Einstein. The real-life Louis Bamberger died in 1944, before the film's set period.

The characters in the film listen to Little Richard's "Tutti-Fruitti," which was released in November 1955, while Albert Einstein died in April of that year.

While some viewers believe Robbins' character can be seen impersonating Don Vito Corleone, portrayed by Marlon Brando, from The Godfather, which was released in 1972, he was actually impersonating the character of Johnny Strabler (also played by Marlon Brando), from The Wild One, a 1953 American film noir, whose persona became a cultural icon of the 1950s.

Production
The director, Fred Schepisi, later said that, while he liked the film, it was not what it could have been:

The problem was there were two other producers, there was a studio and there was Tim Robbins and they were all contributing, and Tim Robbins was being difficult because he said in the '90s nobody would like a character who has a woman fall in love with him because of a lie. That's the whole premise of the film. And it's all right for him to know that and believe it, but he should spend the whole time trying to say, "Hey, I'm lying to you," and be constantly frustrated. Because of that attitude, he pulled the film this way, he pulled it that way while we were writing and it just felt messy. And nobody ever understood the value of those four scientists, and I like the cast that I had, but the other three scientists apart from Walter Matthau were originally going to be Peter Ustinov, Barry Humphries and John Cleese. I wanted them all the way through, but nobody understood how strong they would be. Nobody understood that with a garage and the scientists and this other guy, if you could just stay within that world, if you kept your two lovers together all the time under pressure and you do lots of silly things - there were a couple of wonderfully silly things when they were trying to prove his theory and they kept blowing things up - it had that whimsy about it that would have kept the lovers together and under tension. If they want subplots, they up the stakes and all this formulaic crap - and that's the problem.

Release and reception
I.Q. opened in theaters on Christmas Day. It grossed $3,131,201 during its opening weekend, ranking eighth at the US box office. By the time the film closed, it had grossed $26,381,221 in the United States and Canada. It grossed $47 million worldwide.

The film received mixed reviews from critics, as I.Q. holds a 43% rating on Rotten Tomatoes from 28 reviews.

In Roger Ebert's 3 1/2 star review of the film he gave glowing praise of Walter Matthau's performance: "Matthau as Einstein is a stroke of casting genius. He looks uncannily like the great mathematician. Whether he acts like him I am not in a position to say, but he certainly doesn't act like himself: He has left all his Matthauisms behind, and created this performance from scratch, and it's one of the year's genuine comic gems. He deserves an Oscar nomination."

Year-end lists 
 9th – David Elliott, The San Diego Union-Tribune
 "The second 10" (not ranked) – Sean P. Means, The Salt Lake Tribune

References

External links
 
 
 
 
 I.Q. film script - Dialogue Transcript

1994 films
1994 romantic comedy films
American romantic comedy films
Films directed by Fred Schepisi
Cultural depictions of Albert Einstein
Films set in New Jersey
Paramount Pictures films
Films shot in New Jersey
Films set in the 1950s
Films scored by Jerry Goldsmith
Films about Nobel laureates
Films with screenplays by Andy Breckman
Cultural depictions of Dwight D. Eisenhower
1990s English-language films
1990s American films